Christos Christoforidis (born 31 December 1981) is a Swedish former professional footballer of Greek descent, who played as a forward.

Club career
Christoforidis started his football career at the local IF Sylvia in 2000 and played with them for two seasons. In 2002 he was transferred to Assyriska FF, where he played for three seasons. In July 2004 he was injured and underwent surgery on his adductors and missed the rest of the Swedish championship which ended in October. In January 2005 and after eight months of absence from competitive action he moved to Greece to be tested by the then coach of AEK Athens, Fernando Santos. He left a good impression resulting in him signing a 1+3 year contract with the club.

With AEK, he played in one league match as a starter against Kerkyra and one cup match coming on as a substitute against Panathinaikos. His many months of abstinence resulted Christoforidis not being able to adapt to the team and thus in the summer of the same year left the club. The following two seasons he played at Apollon Kalamarias and Messiniakos, before returning to Sweden in 2007 to play for GAIS.

In 2008 he was loaned  to Syrianska FC, before joining them with a permanent transfer in 2009. In 2010 he joined FK Linköping for a season before moving to Assyriska IF where he played until 2016 when he ended his football career.

References

External links
 

1981 births
Living people
IF Sylvia players
Assyriska FF players
AEK Athens F.C. players
Apollon Pontou FC players
Messiniakos F.C. players
GAIS players
Syrianska FC players
Super League Greece players
Swedish footballers
Swedish people of Greek descent
Sportspeople from Norrköping
Association football forwards
Footballers from Östergötland County